The 42nd South American Swimming Championships were held from 2 to 5 October 2014 in Mar del Plata, Argentina.

Participating countries
Countries which sent teams were:

Results

Men's events

Legend:

Women's events

Legend:

Mixed events

Medal standings
Final medal standings for the 2014 South American Swimming Championships are:

References

External links 
 2014 South American Swimming Champs Results

South American Swimming Championships
South American Swimming Championships
Qualification tournaments for the 2015 Pan American Games
South American Swimming Championships
A
Swimming competitions in Argentina
South American Swimming Championships
Sport in Mar del Plata